Myolaimidae is a family of nematodes in the order Rhabditida. It consists of two genera, Myolaimus and Deleyia.

Genera and species

Deleyia Holovachov & Boström, 2006

Two species are recognized:

Deleyia aspiculata Holovachov & Boström, 2006
Deleyia poinari Holovachov & Boström, 2006

Myolaimus Cobb, 1920

16 species are recognized:

Myolaimus amititiae Andrássy, 1959
Myolaimus byersi Giblin-Davis, Kanzaki, de Ley, Williams, Schierenberg, Ragsdale, Zeng & Center, 2010
Myolaimus cotopaxus Bärmann, Fürst von Lieven & Sudhaus, 2009
Myolaimus dendrodipnis Paesler, 1956
Myolaimus goodeyorum Andrássy, 1984
Myolaimus hermaphrodita Bärmann, Fürst von Lieven & Sudhaus, 2009
Myolaimus heterurus Cobb, 1920
Myolaimus hortulanus Bärmann, Fürst von Lieven & Sudhaus, 2009
Myolaimus ibericus Abolafia & Pena-Santiago, 2016
Myolaimus indicus Ali, Farooqui & Suryawanshi, 1970
Myolaimus maupasi (Sanwal, 1960)
Myolaimus mycophilus Slos & Bert in Slos, Couvreur & Bert, 2018
Myolaimus rahmi Sudhaus, 1977
Myolaimus stammeri Hirschmann, 1952
Myolaimus tepidus Andrássy, 2005
Myolaimus xylophilus Bärmann, Fürst von Lieven & Sudhaus, 2009

References

Rhabditida
Nematode families